The World International Piano Competition is a classical piano competition in Santa Fe, New Mexico, which was first held in 2002, and continued in 2004-2005, 2007-2008, 2010 and 2011–2012.  

The competition was founded by Lawrence D. Porter and its theme is "Seeking depth and maturity beyond virtuosity".

Former prize winners
(Listed on the competition website.)

2011–2012 
 First Place:  $5,000, Alexey Sychev
 Second Place: $1,000 Angelo Arciglione
 Third Place:  $500 Yangmingtian Zhao

2010 

 First Place:  $5,000, Eun-Shik Park
 Second Place: $1,500, Frank Huang
 Third Place:  $500, Tzu-Feng Liu

2008 
 First Place:  $5,000, Christopher Atzinger
 Second Place: $2,000, Esther Park
 Third Place:  $1,000, Mauricio Arias
 Fourth Place: $500,  Noel Engebretson
 Fifth Place (tie): $250 - Michael Schneider & Rena Rzayeva

2005 
 Solo Division
 First Place (tie): Yuri Chayama & Mana Tokuno
 Second Place: Fred Karpoff
 Third Place: Michael Schneider

 Concerto Division
 First Place (tie): Fred Karpoff & Ioannis Potamousis

See also 
 List of classical music competitions
 World Federation of International Music Competitions

References

External links 
 
 "International Piano Competition (Santa Fe, NM)", on Facebook
 2010 World International Piano Competition (Santa Fe, NM) - Online Internet Piano Competition, on YouTube

Piano competitions in the United States
Music festivals in New Mexico
Recurring events established in 2002
Culture of Santa Fe, New Mexico
Classical music awards
2002 establishments in New Mexico